The groupement des autorités responsables de transport (GART, "Association of Transport Authorities") is a French Association (as defined by the ) founded in 1980. It is formed of 263 , of which 185 are agglomeration communities  or urban communities, 59 are general councils and 19 are regional councils. These members have the objective of implementing and improving public transport in France. GART is a platform of exchange and transport matters, representing all political tendencies, and acts as their spokesbody at the national and European level.

Mission 
To be the spokesbody for French transport organisations before institutions, government, parliament, European Union bodies and the mass media.
 To offer to its members advice and expertise on economic, financial, legal and technical matters.
 Sustain and enliven debates on new projects and propose solutions that are both practical and innovative.
 Bring together players in the transport industry. GART stands up for "" ("The concept of a public transport service accessible to all at the economic, spatial and physical levels. The poor, those far from town, or with reduced mobility, should all benefit from the best possible transport to have access to education, work, facilities and services").

Leadership 
The association is headed by a President, in September 2014 this was Louis Nègre mayor of Cagnes-sur-Mer since 1995. The previous incumbent was Roland Ries, the senator-mayor of Strasbourg, elected in 2008 and re-elected in 2011.
Ries was vice-president of GART from 1996 to 2001.

Complementary activities 
Its mission was to promote sustainable public transport both to the public at large and to professionals in the sector (organising major European events and national mobilisation campaigns).

Sources

References

External links 
  Official website
 
 

Transport authorities in France
Trade associations based in France